Bruna Santos Nhaia (born 16 June 2002), known as Bruninha or just Bruna, is a Brazilian professional footballer who plays as a right back for NWSL club NJ/NY Gotham FC and the Brazil women's national team.

Club career
Born in Castro, Paraná, Bruninha joined Chapecoense's youth setup after a trial period in 2016. In 2018 she made her first team debut, but moved to Internacional in 2019; she was initially assigned to the under-18 squad.

Bruninha started to feature in the first team of Inter during the 2020 campaign, scoring a goal on her debut in a 3–0 away win against Vitória on 5 September. In February 2021, she moved to Santos FC.

On 23 August 2022, Santos FC transferred Bruninha to NJ/NY Gotham FC of the American National Women's Soccer League for an undisclosed fee.

Career statistics

International

Honours

International
Brazil U20
South American Under-20 Women's Football Championship: 2022

References

External links
 

2002 births
Living people
Sportspeople from Paraná (state)
Brazilian women's footballers
Women's association football defenders
Campeonato Brasileiro de Futebol Feminino Série A1 players
Santos FC (women) players
Brazil women's international footballers
National Women's Soccer League players
NJ/NY Gotham FC players
Brazilian expatriate women's footballers
Expatriate soccer players in the United States
Sport Club Internacional (women) players